The Moving Picture World was an influential early trade journal for the American film industry, from 1907 to 1927. An industry powerhouse at its height, Moving Picture World frequently reiterated its independence from the film studios.

In 1911, the magazine bought out Views and Film Index. Its reviews illustrate the standards and tastes of film in its infancy, and shed light on story content in those early days. By 1914, it had a reported circulation of approximately 15,000.

The publication was founded by James Petrie (J.P.) Chalmers, Jr. (1866–1912), who began publishing in March 1907 as The Moving Picture World and View Photographer.

In December 1927, it was announced that the publication was merging with the Exhibitor's Herald, when it was reported the combined circulation of the papers would be 16,881.  In 1931, a subsequent merger with the Motion Picture News occurred, creating the Motion Picture Herald.

A Spanish language version of the magazine, entitled Cine-Mundial, was published from 1916–1948.

Two indexes have been published to assist in locating information in this valuable journal: An Index to Short and Feature Film Reviews in the Moving Picture World: The Early Years, 1907-1915 and Filmmakers in The Moving Picture World: An Index of Articles, 1907-1927  and

References

External links

The Moving Picture World, archived issues at Media History Digital Library at archive.org
Volume 3 (July–December 1908)
Volume 17, Issues 1–6 (July 5, 1913 – August 9, 1913)
Volume 25, Issues 4–6 (July 15, 1915 – August 7, 1915)

Defunct magazines published in the United States
Film magazines published in the United States
Magazines established in 1907
Magazines disestablished in 1927
Magazines published in New York City